Líšnice is a municipality and village in Šumperk District in the Olomouc Region of the Czech Republic. It has about 400 inhabitants.

Administrative parts
The village of Vyšehorky is an administrative part of Líšnice.

References

Villages in Šumperk District